AOS, Aos or AoS may refer to:

Military, police and government
 Armed Offenders Squad, a branch of the New Zealand Police
 Armed Offenders Squad (Victoria), a disbanded branch of the Victorian Police in Australia
 Amook Bay Seaplane Base (IATA code AOS)
 Adjustment of status, an immigration concept in the United States

Schools and education
 Academy of the Sierras, boarding schools devoted to weight loss
 The Alice Ottley School, Worcester, England
 AO Springfield School, Worcester, England
 Associate of Occupational Studies, a two-year college degree
 Annunciation Orthodox School, a Greek Orthodox private school in Houston, Texas
 Loudoun Academy of Science, a high school STEM program in Loudoun County, Virginia

Science and academia
 Accessory olfactory system, a second sense of smell in some animals
 Accounting, Organizations and Society, an academic journal
 Acquisition of signal, in spacecraft communications
 Agricultural Ontology Service
 American Oriental Society, a learned society
 American Ornithological Society
 Angle of sideslip
 Apraxia of speech, a speech sound disorder
 Area of Search, a geographical region used in the selection of Sites of Special Scientific Interest in the UK
 Adams–Oliver syndrome, a congenital disorder

Popular culture
 Agents of S.H.I.E.L.D., an American television series set in the Marvel Cinematic Universe
 Ace of Spades (video game)
 Ace of Spades HQ, a political blog
 Aeon of Strife, an early multiplayer online battle arena (MOBA)
 Age of Sail (computer game)
 Age of Sail II, its sequel
 Castlevania: Aria of Sorrow, a game for the Game Boy Advance
 "AOS" (song), 1970, by Yoko Ono, featuring Ornette Coleman
 All-Out Sundays, a Philippine GMA Network Sunday variety show
 Warhammer Age of Sigmar, a tabletop wargame

Technology
 Academic Operating System, a version of 4.3 BSD Unix for the IBM RT
 Algebraic operating system, an input method used on many Texas Instruments calculators
 AmigaOS
 Apple Online Store, the retail web site for Apple Inc.
 Array of structures, an interleaved data format
 Data General AOS (Advanced Operating System)
 A2, an operating system formerly named Active Object System (AOS)
 Fedora AOS (Appliance Operating System), a small version of the Fedora Linux project

People
 Austin Osman Spare (1886–1956), English occultist and artist

See also
 AO (disambiguation)
 OS (disambiguation)
 ADOS (disambiguation)
 Aeos (disambiguation)
 EOS (disambiguation)